Paedocypris progenetica is a species of tiny cyprinid fish endemic to the Indonesian islands of Sumatra and Bintan where it is found in peat swamps and blackwater streams. It was discovered by Singaporean ichthyologist Heok Hui 
Tan.  He has written a description of the fish along with another species of the same genus called Paedocypris micromegethes.

References

Paedocypris
Cyprinid fish of Asia
Freshwater fish of Indonesia
Taxa named by Maurice Kottelat
Taxa named by Ralf Britz
Taxa named by Heok Hui Tan
Taxa named by Kai-Erik Witte
Fish described in 2006